Scott Dikkers (born March 1, 1965) is an American comedy writer, speaker and entrepreneur. He was a founding editor of The Onion, and is the publication's longest-serving editor-in-chief, holding the position from 1988–1999, 2005–2008, and as General Manager / Vice President of Creative Development from 2012–2014. He currently heads the "Writing with The Onion" program in partnership with The Onion and The Second City in Chicago.

Biography
Born in 1965 in Minneapolis, Minnesota, Scott Dikkers is the author or co-author of several best-selling humor books including "How to Write Funny". He is also the creator and artist of the comic strip Jim's Journal, which was syndicated to college newspapers from 1987–1997. Dikkers has also written and directed several films, including episodes of "The Onion News Network" web videos (2007) and the independent features Spaceman (1997), and Bad Meat (2003), starring Chevy Chase. Scott currently runs online courses about comedy writing where he teaches his subscribers and students to write comedy, be more scalable and take charge of their comedy writing business.

Books 
 The Joke at the End of the World (writer) (2020,)
 Outrageous Marketing: The Story of The Onion and How To Build a Powerful Brand with No Marketing Budget (writer) (2018,)
 Trump's America: The Complete Loser's Guide (editor-in-chief, co-writer) (2016)
 Onion books
 Our Dumb Century: 100 Years of Headlines From America's Finest News Source (editor-in-chief, co-writer) (1999)
 "The Onion's Finest News Reporting, Volume One" (co-editor with Robert D. Siegel, co-writer) (2000)
 "Dispatches from the Tenth Circle: The Best of The Onion" (co-writer) (2001)
 "Homeland Insecurity: The Onion Complete News Archives, Volume 17" (co-editor with Carol Kolb, co-writer) (2006)
 Our Dumb World (editor-in-chief, co-writer) (2007)
 "45: A Portrait of My Knucklehead Brother Jeb" by George W. Bush (co-written with Peter Hilleren) (2015)
 How To Write Funny (writer) (2014)
 How to Write Funnier (writer) (2019)
 How to Write Funniest (writer) (2020)
 "Destined For Destiny: The Unauthorized Autobiography of George W. Bush" (co-writer with Peter Hilleren) (2006)
 You Are Worthless: Depressing Nuggets of Wisdom Sure to Ruin Your Day (credited to "Dr. Oswald T. Pratt and Dr. Scott Dikkers") (1999)
 Jim's Journal cartoon collections (all strips and books credited to "Jim")
 I Went to College and It Was Okay: A Collection of Jim's Journal Cartoons (1991)
 I Got a Job and It Wasn't That Bad: The Second Collection of Jim's Journal Cartoons (1993)
 I Made Some Brownies and They Were Pretty Good: The Third Jim's Journal Collection (1995)
 I Got Married If You Can Believe That: The Fourth Collection of Jim's Journal Cartoons (1996)
 I Feel Like a Grown-Up Now: The Fifth Jim's Journal Collection (1998)
 The Pretty Good Jim's Journal Treasury: The Definitive Collection of Every Published Cartoon 1999)
 "Plebes" cartoon collections (all strips and books credited to "L. T. Horton")
 "The Ascent of Plebes" (1990)
 "Plebes: The Cartoon Guide for College Guys" (2001)
 "Kimberly Crotchet, Librarian of Tomorrow (co-writer and artist with James Sturm), 1988, self-published.
 "Commix" (co-writer with James Sturm, Chris Ware, J. Keen, Kathryn Rathke, Jay Rath, J. Keen), 1988, self-published.

Filmography

References

External links
 Dikkers Cartoon Company
 clip from Bad Meat
 Spaceman official site archive
 
 Salon review of You Are Worthless and The Pretty Good Jim's Journal Treasury

1965 births
Living people
American comic strip cartoonists
The Onion people